Stop, drop and roll is a simple fire safety technique taught to children, emergency service personnel and industrial workers as a component of health and safety training in English-speaking North America, and most other English-speaking countries. It involves three steps a fire victim should follow to minimize injury in the event their clothing catches fire.

Procedure
Stop, drop and roll consists of three components:

 Stop – The fire-affected person must stop, ceasing any movement which may fan the flames or hamper those attempting to put the fire out.
 Drop – The fire-affected person must drop to the ground, lying down if possible, covering their face with their hands to avoid facial injury. 
 Roll – The fire-affected person must roll on the ground in an effort to extinguish the fire by depriving it of oxygen. If the victim is on a rug or one is nearby, they can roll the rug around themselves to further extinguish the flame.

The effectiveness of stop, drop and roll may be further enhanced by combining it with other firefighting techniques, including the use of a fire extinguisher, dousing with water, or fire beating one's skin.

Those teaching the technique are advised to teach children the proper circumstances for its use. As such, some advice pamphlets regarding the technique suggest reminding children that this technique is only to be used in the event of catching on fire and not when a smoke alarm is sounding in a situation that requires immediate evacuation. Furthermore, some advice on the technique advises the procedure of "stop, drop and roll and cover your face," as this will help to protect the face from any flames.

References

External links
 Alisa Ann Ruch Burn Foundation
 Are you Prepared?
 Fire Safety guidelines Columbia University

Firefighting
First aid
Safety practices